The Solihull Metropolitan Borough Council elections were held on Thursday, 7 May 1987, with one third of the council to be elected. The Conservatives retained control of the council. Voter turnout was 43.2%

Election result

|- style="background-color:#F9F9F9"
! style="background-color: " |
| Independent Ratepayers & Residents 
| align="right" | 1
| align="right" | 0
| align="right" | 1
| align="right" | -1
| align="right" | 5.9
| align="right" | 8.1
| align="right" | 5,499
| align="right" | -0.2%
|-

This result had the following consequences for the total number of seats on the council after the elections:

Ward results

|- style="background-color:#F6F6F6"
! style="background-color: " |
| colspan="2"   | Conservative gain from Independent Residents
| align="right" | Swing
| align="right" | +3.3
|-

|- style="background-color:#F6F6F6"
! style="background-color: " |
| colspan="2"   | Independent Ratepayers hold 
| align="right" | Swing
| align="right" | -5.8
|-

References

1987 English local elections
1987
1980s in the West Midlands (county)